Marcel Monette (28 January 1895 – 17 January 1966) was a Liberal party member of the House of Commons of Canada. He was born in Saint-Édouard-de-Napierville, Quebec and became a baker by career.

He was first elected at the Mercier riding in a 1949 by-election. Monette was re-elected to successive terms in 1953 and 1957 then defeated in 1958 by André Gillet of the Progressive Conservative party.

References
 

1895 births
1966 deaths
Members of the House of Commons of Canada from Quebec
Liberal Party of Canada MPs
Canadian bakers